Qaderabad (also Romanized as Qāderābād; also known as Ghāder Abad) is a village in Kahnuk Rural District, Irandegan District, Khash County, Sistan and Baluchestan Province, Iran. At the 2006 census, its population was 13, in 4 families.

References 

Populated places in Khash County